The First LG Cup is an exhibition association football tournament that took place in Tunisia.

Participants 
The participants were:

Venue

Results

Semifinals

Third place match

Final

External links 

 Details at RSSSF

References

International association football competitions hosted by Tunisia